R. nitida may refer to:
 Rarahu nitida, a spider species endemic to Samoa
 Rosa nitida, the shining rose, a plant species native to northeastern North America, from Connecticut north to Newfoundland and Quebec

See also 
 Nitida (disambiguation)